Denmark women's national under-19 football team is the football team representing Denmark in competitions for under-19 year old players and is controlled by the Danish Football Association.

Competitive record

FIFA U-20 Women's World Cup

UEFA Women's Under-19 Championship

Team

Current squad
The following 20 players were called up to the Denmark squad for the La Manga Tournament in March 2020.

Caps and goals as of 25 May 2020.

Head coach: Søren Randa-Boldt

External links
U19-landsholdet - DBU

Women's national under-19 association football teams
under
European women's national under-19 association football teams